Soğukpınar  (literally "cool fountain") is a belde (town) in Espiye district of Giresun Province, Turkey. The population of Soğukpınar was  2,497 as of 2013. According to the earliest reference to the settlement as of 1530, the former name of Soğukpınar was Dikmen-Döğer referring to a Turkish tribe. Later in 1800s Greek workers also settled in the settlement to work in the mines around. But they left the settlement after the Population exchange agreement between Greece and Turkey in 1920s. In 1999 Soğukpınar was declared  a seat of township. Hazel and corn are the main crops of Soğukpınar. Salmon trout and beehiving are other economic activities.

References

External links
For images

Populated places in Giresun Province
Towns in Turkey
Espiye District